Pour Me may refer to: 

"Pour Me" (Trick Pony song)
 "Pour Me", a b-side to the Coldplay single "Fix You"
 "Pour Me", a song by Hollywood Undead on the 2011 album American Tragedy